Catalogue of Oriental Manuscripts, Xylographs etc. in Danish Collections, COMDC , is an international scholarly catalogue describing the manuscripts from Asia and North Africa in the Royal Danish Library, the National Museum of Denmark and a few other Danish collections. It is published in collaboration between the Royal Library and the University of Copenhagen, with support from the Carlsberg Foundation.

History 

The interest the Oriental culture is stretching back to the 17th century. Since then, Danish expeditions and Danish travelers brought home a substantial number of Oriental and North African manuscripts that are of interest to scholars, for book history, for the research in Eastern religions and culture (Islam, Buddhism, Tibet, etc.) and for researchers dealing with language, literature and history.

Denmark holds today in some areas collections, which are among the most significant outside Asia. An example is the Mongolian collection of manuscripts and block prints, which were supplemented significantly during the second Danish Central Asian Expedition 1938-39, a collection of scrolls acquired in 1915 from a Buddhist temple in Dunhuang and the Tibetan collection, containing sources of a language and a culture, which is currently under severe pressure.

The edition 

Already 1846-1857 the Royal Library published a first overview of acquired manuscripts in three volumes with the title Codices Orientales Bibliothecae Regiae Havniensis, published by N.L. Westergaard and A.F. Mehren. The collection of Oriental manuscripts grew steadily in Denmark during the following hundred years, and in 1952 the philologist, professor dr. phil. Kaare Grønbech, University of Copenhagen, in close cooperation with the Royal Danish Library initiated a new edition. Kaare Grønbech was the first editor. Head of the Oriental Department at the Royal Library Stig T. Rasmussen has since 1992 been the main editor of the edition.

The edition is particularly aims at the international research community. The edition therefore offers not only a catalogue of each manuscript, but also a more detailed description of the manuscripts with representations of texts, the cultural background and the historical significance. These descriptions are complemented by photographic reproductions, in order for international researchers to get a pretty good idea of what each manuscript contains.

The volumes

 Codices Orientales Bibliothecae Regiae Havniensis
 Pars 1, Codices Indici, N. L. Westergaard, 1846 Link to digital edition
 Pars 2, Codices Hebraici et Arabici, 1851 Link to digital edition
 Pars 3, Codices Persici, Turcici, Hindustanici variique alii, A. F. Mehren, 1857 Link to digital edition

 Catalogue of Oriental Manuscripts, Xylographs etc in Danish Collections, COMDC
 Vol. 1. Catalogue of Ceylonese Manuscripts / C.E. Godakumbura, 1980. Link to digital edition
 Vol. 2.1. Catalogue of Cambodian and Burmese Pāli manuscripts / C.E. Godakumbura, assisted by U Tin Lwin, 1983. Link to digital edition
 Vol. 2.2. Catalogue des Manuscrits en Pali, Laotien et Siamois provenant de la Thaïlande / Georges Cœdès, 1966. Link to digital edition
 Vol. 3. Catalogue of Mongol Books, Manuscripts and Xylographs / Walther Heissig, assisted by Charles Bawdin, 1971.  to digital edition
 Vol. 4.1. Catalogue of Indonesian Manuscripts. Part 1. / P.Voorhoeve, with a contribution by Carl Schuster, 1975. Link to digital edition
 Vol. 4.2. Catalogue of Indonesian Manuscripts. Part 2. / Th. Pigeaud, F.H. van Naerssen and P.Voorhoeve, 1977. Link to digital edition
 Vol. 5.1. Catalogue of Arabic Manuscripts, Codices Arabici & codices Arabici additamenta / Ali Abdalhussein Alhaidary and Stig T. Rasmussen, 1995.
 Vol. 5.2. Catalogue of Arabic manuscripts, Codices Arabici & codices Arabici additamenta / Irmeli Perho, 2003.
 Vol. 5.3. Book 1-3. Catalogue of Arabic manuscripts, Codices Arabici & codices Arabici additamenta / Irmeli Perho, 2007.
 Vol. 6.1-2. Catalogue of Tibetan Manuscripts and Xylographs / Hartmut Buescher and Tarab Tulku, 2000.
 Vol. 7.1 Catalogue of Sanskrit Manuscripts / Hartmut Buescher, 2011.
 Vol. 8.1. Catalogue of Persian manuscripts / Irmeli Perho, 2014.
 Vol. 9. Catalogue of Chinese manuscripts and rare books  /  Bent Lerbæk Pedersen, 2014.
 Vol. 10.1. Catalogue of Japanese manuscripts and rare books / Merete Pedersen, 2015.
 Vol. 10.2. Catalogue of Korean manuscripts and rare books / Bent Lerbæk Pedersen, 2014.

Notes

External links 
The COMDC-publications presented by NIAS Press Publishers  

Catalogues
Buddhist manuscripts
Chinese manuscripts
Jewish manuscripts